Robert Byron Boyd (August 31, 1864 – July 6, 1941) was an American politician and businessperson from Maine. A Republican from Augusta, Boyd served as Secretary of State of Maine from 1897 to 1907.

Boyd was born in Carleton County, New Brunswick, Canada in 1864 and moved with his family at the age of four to Linneus, Maine in the United States. He graduated from Houlton Academy, which later became Ricker College as well as Colby College.

He died in 1941 and is buried in Forest Grove Cemetery in Augusta.

References

1864 births
1941 deaths
People from Carleton County, New Brunswick
Politicians from Augusta, Maine
Ricker College alumni
Colby College alumni
Canadian emigrants to the United States
Secretaries of State of Maine
Maine Republicans
Businesspeople from Maine
People from Linneus, Maine